Vladislava "Vladica" Milosavljević (born 8 July 1955) is a Serbian film, theater and television actress.

Career
Milosavljević was born in  Belgrade, Serbia on 8 July 1955 in artistic family. Her father was a prominent Serbian actor Dragoljub "Gula" Milosavljević (1923–2005). Milosavljević attended secondary school of design, graphics. She graduated from Belgrade's Academy of Theater, Film, Radio and Television in 1979, her mentor was professor Predrag Bajčetić. Among her notable classmates were Mladen Andrejević, Radovan Miljanić. Her theater and film career spanned decades. She is a full time member of the Yugoslav Drama Theatre in Belgrade. She was a guest star in Atelje 212 theater in a drama "Bliže", directed by Alisa Stojanović. She had several leading roles in television films: "Alma Mahler", "Nedovršena simfonija", "Ivana", "Maska" (written by Miloš Crnjanski). In 2002, Milosavljević starred in a television comedy "Akcija tigar" directed  by Slobodan Ćustić; and in 2003, short length film "Akcija".
  
She appeared in more than fifty films since 1978.

Personal life
Milosavljević has two adult sons, Mihajlo and Gavrilo with her husband Aleksandar Rafajlović (b. 1957) a  prominent Serbian painter.

Selected filmography

References

External links 

1955 births
Living people
Actresses from Belgrade
Serbian film actresses
20th-century Serbian actresses